"Love the World" (stylized as "love the world") is Perfume's 7th major single. It was released on July 9, 2008 and debuted at number one on the Oricon chart, becoming the first electropop song from an electropop act to do so, Yellow Magic Orchestra's song "Kimi ni, Mune Kyun" being the previous record holder at #2, twenty-five years prior. Love the World is Perfume's best-selling single in the span of their career.

The single's B-side, "edge", was used as background music for a KOSE Fasio commercial starring Aya Ueto.

Track listing

Oricon chart positions

Certifications

References

2008 songs
Perfume (Japanese band) songs
Songs written by Yasutaka Nakata
Oricon Weekly number-one singles
Billboard Japan Hot 100 number-one singles
Song recordings produced by Yasutaka Nakata